Blue Ice Pictures is a Canadian production company. It acquired South African production company Out of Africa in 2012, and Canadian production company Foundry Films from Daniel Iron in 2013.

Productions 
Recent productions include:
 Astrid and Lilly Save the World
 Ginny & Georgia
 SurrealEstate
 Spinning Out
 Vagrant Queen
 Goalie
 In Contempt
 The Indian Detective
 Madiba

References

External links 
 Blue Ice Pictures

Film production companies of Canada
Companies based in Toronto
Companies with year of establishment missing
Television production companies of Canada